Albert W. Fuller (1854-1934) was an American architect practicing in Albany, New York.

Life and career
Fuller was born in the town of Clinton, New York. From 1873 to 1879 he trained as a draftsman in the office of Albany architects Ogden & Wright. He then opened his own office.  In 1883 he formed a partnership with William A. Wheeler, a native Albanian who had studied under Boston architects. This firm lasted until 1897. He practiced alone until 1900, when he formed a partnership with William B. Pitcher (1864–1921), a former draftsman of Fuller's. The firm was incorporated in January 1906, and Pitcher retired in 1909, due to poor health.  Fuller then established a partnership with William P. Robinson.

The firm lasted until 1934, with Fuller's death. Fuller died in his office, while resting from his work. His death was attributed to heart disease.

Architectural works

Albert W. Fuller, 1879-1883
 1881 - George W. van Slyke House, 756 Madison Ave, Albany, New York
 1882 - Albany County Bank Building, 6 S Pearl St, Albany, New York
 Demolished in 1927.
 1882 - Charles B. Kountze House, 225 E 16th Ave, Denver, Colorado
 Demolished in 1963.
 1883 - Albany Safe Deposit and Storage Building, 60 Maiden Ln, Albany, New York
 Demolished.
 1883 - Frederick Haslett House, 87 Main St., Fort Plain, NY

Fuller & Wheeler, 1883-1897
 1885 - Edward Ellis House, 215 Union St, Schenectady, New York
 1885 - Horace G. Young House, 425 State St, Albany, New York
 1886 - Hampton B. Denman House, 1623 16th St NW, Washington, DC
 1886 - Henry C. Pierce House, 40 Vandeventer Pl, St. Louis, Missouri
 Demolished. Vendeventer Place no longer exists.
 1886 - Delaware & Hudson Station, Bridge St, Plattsburgh, New York
 1886 - Y. M. C. A. Building, 62 N Pearl St, Albany, New York
 1887 - Academy of Music, 82 Broadway, Newburgh, New York
 Later the Academy Theatre. Demolished.
 1887 - Auburn High School, Genesee St, Auburn, New York
 Demolished.
 1887 - Zenas Crane House (Willow Brook), 30 Main St, Dalton, Massachusetts
 Demolished.
 1887 - Hoosick Falls M. E. Church, 130 Main St, Hoosick Falls, New York
 1888 - Louis D. Collins House (Belhurst), 4069 Route 14, Geneva, New York
 1888 - Earl Memorial Chapel and Crematorium, Oakwood Cemetery, Troy, New York
 1888 - Harmanus Bleecker Hall, 161 Washington Ave, Albany, New York
 Burned in 1940.
 1888 - Delaware & Hudson Station, 20 Park Pl, Port Henry, New York
 1889 - Edward McKinney House, 391 State St, Albany, New York
 1889 - Normal Hall, Plattsburgh Normal School, Plattsburgh, New York
 Burned in 1929.
 1889 - Silliman (Couper) Hall, Hamilton College, Clinton, New York
 1889 - Y. M. C. A Building, 1155 Rue Metcalfe, Montreal, Quebec
 Demolished.
 1889 - Y. M. C. A. Building, Main & Court Sts, New Britain, Connecticut
 Demolished.
 1890- Andrew S. Baker House, 129 S Lake Ave, Albany, New York
 1890 - Public School No. 10, 250 Central Ave, Albany, New York
 1890 - Soldiers and Sailors Monument, Monument Square, Troy, New York
 1891 - 4th Precinct Police Station, 419 Madison Ave, Albany, New York
 1891 - Alden Chester House, 139 S Lake Ave, Albany, New York
 1891 - Hudson River Telephone Building, Maiden Ln & Chapel St, Albany, New York
 Demolished.
 1892 - Iliff Hall, Iliff School of Theology, Denver, Colorado
 1892 - Montgomery County Courthouse, 58 Broadway, Fonda, New York
 1893 - Auditorium, Northfield Seminary, Northfield, Massachusetts
 1893 - Convention Hall, 268 Broadway, Saratoga Springs, New York
 Demolished.
 1893 - Henry W. Warren House (Fitzroy Place), 2160 S Cook St, Denver, Colorado
 1893 - Public School No. 6, 105 2nd St, Albany, New York
 Demolished.
 1893 - Public School No. 24, Delaware & Madison Aves, Albany, New York
 Demolished.
 1894 - DeGraaf Building, 23 S Pearl St, Albany, New York
 Demolished.
 1894 - Forest Presbyterian Church, 4019 Center St, Lyons Falls, New York
 1894 - Normal Hall, Oneonta Normal School, Oneonta, New York
 Demolished in 1977.
 1895 - Alpha Delta Phi Fraternity House, Union College, Schenectady, New York
 Now the college's Grant Hall.
 1895 - Masonic Temple, 67 Corning Pl, Albany, New York
 1895 - Rectory for St. Peter's Episcopal Church, 107 State St, Albany, New York
 1895 - Silliman Memorial Presbyterian Church, Mohawk & Seneca Sts, Cohoes, New York
 Demolished in 1998.
 1896 - Home Savings Bank Building, 13 N Pearl St, Albany, New York
 Demolished.
 1897 - Albany Hospital, 47 New Scotland Ave, Albany, New York
 Demolished.

Albert W. Fuller, 1897-1900
 1897 - Moody Memorial Chapel, Mount Hermon School, Gill, Massachusetts
 1898 - Centennial Hall, 7 Pine St, Albany, New York
 The former school and convent of St. Mary's R. C. Church.
 1898 - George T. Fulford House (Fulford Place), 287 King St E, Brockville, Ontario
 1898 - Lackawanna Trust and Safe Deposit Building, 506 Spruce St, Scranton, Pennsylvania
 Demolished.
 1898 - Watervliet High School, 1408-1412 4th Ave, Watervliet, New York
 Demolished.
 1899 - Mechanicville M. E. Church, 7 N Main St, Mechanicville, New York
 1899 - Union Free School, 7 Stewart Farrar Ave, Warrensburg, New York
 Demolished.
 1900 - Richards Library, 36 Elm St, Warrensburg, New York

Fuller & Pitcher, 1900-1905
 1900 - Glens Falls City Hall, 42 Ridge St, Glens Falls, New York
 1900 - Public Bath No. 1, 665 Broadway, Albany, New York
 Demolished.
 1901 - Charles Gibson and William J. Walker Houses, 415-417 State St, Albany, New York
 1901 - Charlotte Williams Memorial Hospital, 1201 E Broad St, Richmond, Virginia
 1901 - James McCredie House, 403 State St, Albany, New York
 1901 - Public School No. 12, 27 Western Ave, Albany, New York
 1901 - Trinity Episcopal Church, 1336 1st Ave, Watervliet, New York
 1902 - Amsterdam Free Library, 28 Church St, Amsterdam, New York
 1902 - Gordius H. P. Gould House, Main St, Lyons Falls, New York
 1902 - Guy Park Avenue School, 300 Guy Park Ave, Amsterdam, New York
 1902 - Johnstown Public Library, 38 S Market St, Johnstown, New York
 1903 - Hackley Hospital, 1700 Clinton St, Muskegon, Michigan
 Demolished.
 1904 - Ellis Hospital, 1101 Nott St, Schenectady, New York
 1904 - Y. M. C. A. Building (former), 2101 Telegraph Ave, Oakland, California

Fuller & Pitcher Company, 1906-1909
 1906 - Albany Institute and Historical Art Society, 125 Washington Ave, Albany, New York
 1906 - Manufacturers Bank Building, 91 Remsen St, Cohoes, New York
 1907 - Masonic Hall, 2 Russell Ave, Ravena, New York
 1909 - Engineering Building (Reamer Campus Center), Union College, Schenectady, New York
 1909 - Johnstown High School, W Montgomery & S Market Sts, Johnstown, New York
 Demolished.

Fuller & Robinson Company, 1909-1934
 1910 - Watervliet High School, 14th St, Watervliet, New York
 now the Watervliet Civic Center.
 1912 - Berkshire Hotel, 140 State St, Albany, New York
 1912 - Herkimer High School, 435 N Bellinger St, Herkimer, New York
 1913 - Ilion High School, Weber Ave, Ilion, New York
 Burned in 1963.
 1913 - Union Free School, Cemetery Rd, New Lebanon, New York
 Demolished in 2012.
 1913 - Masonic Temple, 48 Grand St, Newburgh, New York
 1915 - Kinney & Woodward Building, 74 State St, Albany, New York
 1916 - Fair Haven Grade School, 115 N Main St, Fair Haven, Vermont
 1917 - First Congregational Church, 405 Quail St, Albany, New York
 1917 - Public School No. 19, 395 New Scotland Ave, Albany, New York
 1921 - Bay Shore High School, 155 3rd Ave, Bay Shore, New York
 1922 - North School, 217 N Washington St, Herkimer, New York
 1923 - Albany Hardware and Iron Building, 139 Broadway, Albany, New York
 1923 - Harmanus Bleecker Library, 19 Dove St, Albany, New York
 1924 - University Club, 141 Washington Ave, Albany, New York
 1925 - Gates B. Aufsessor House, 570 Providence St, Albany, New York
 1927 - Walter A. Wood High School, Eberle Way, Hoosick Falls, New York
 Demolished in 1968.
 1928 - Albany Law School, 80 New Scotland Ave, Albany, New York
 1929 - Franklin Academy (former), 15 Francis St, Malone, New York
 Now the Malone Middle School.
 1931 - Bethlehem Central High School, 332 Kenwood Ave, Delmar, New York

Published works

 Artistic Homes in City and Country, 1882.  Reissued five times between 1882 and 1891.

References

External links

1854 births
1934 deaths
Architects from New York (state)
Architects from Albany, New York
People from Clinton, Oneida County, New York